Indian Wells Valley is an arid north-south basin in east-central California.  In the geologic sense, it is a southern extension of Owens Valley to the north, with the recent volcanics of the Coso Range being the separator.  It is defined by a major fault on the west side of the valley. Unlike Owens Valley, it is bound by a fault to the south, the Garlock Fault (within the El Paso Mountains).  This valley is part of the northwesternmost Mojave Desert plant community and ecoregion.

The largest city in the valley is Ridgecrest.  Other locations include Inyokern, Indian Wells, and communities associated with the China Lake Naval Weapons Center, the primary industry in the valley.  California State Route 14 and US Highway 395 are the main transportation corridors through the valley.

See also
Tehachapi Wind Resource Area

External links

Groundwater Quality in the Indian Wells Valley, California United States Geological Survey

Valleys of the Mojave Desert
Valleys of Inyo County, California
Valleys of Kern County, California
Valleys of San Bernardino County, California
Mojave Desert
Ridgecrest, California
Valleys of California